Brunei competed at the 2017 Asian Indoor and Martial Arts Games held in Ashgabat, Turkmenistan from September 17 to 27. Brunei sent a delegation consisting of only 1 billiards player for the event.

Brunei didn't receive any medal at the Games.

Participants

References 

Nations at the 2017 Asian Indoor and Martial Arts Games
Asian
Brunei at the Asian Games